This is a list of contestants who have appeared on the American television program So You Think You Can Dance and progressed to the live performance show stage of the competition.

Contestants

All-Stars Dance Pool
The "All-Stars" dance pool, introduced in season 7, is composed of notable past SYTYCD finalists who partner with new contestants for some of their routines. These non-competing dancers perform mainly in the genres that are their expertise and may perform only once or several times over the course of a season.  With the exception of one season 10 episode, they do not choreograph these routines but rather learn them alongside their contestant partners.  They have also occasionally been featured in non-competitive performances during results shows, reprising past well-received routines or new group dances; however, the table below references only duets performed with competing partners.

See also
 List of dancers